The 2004 Mnet KM Music Video Festival (MKMF) was the sixth of the annual music awards in Seoul, South Korea, that took place on December 4, 2004, at the Kyung Hee University.

Solo artists Rain and BoA lead the nominees with three nominations each. Although each of them received the daesang awards, boyband Shinhwa was the only artist/group to receive two awards by the end of the ceremony.

Background
The award ceremony, previously known as the Mnet Music Video Festival, merged with the KMTV Korean Music Awards and was renamed accordingly. The grand awards (or daesang) were Best Popular Music Video and Music Video of the Year. For the second time, the event took place at the Kyung Hee University, and Shin Dong-yup and Kim Jung-eun hosted the event together again, the first was during the fourth MKMF.

During this year, the category for Best OST was introduced for the first time. Three international artists performed in one night; Jerry Yan became the first Taiwanese singer to perform on the event.

Criteria
The following criteria for winners include:

Winners and nominees

Winners are listed first and highlighted in boldface.

Special awards
 Best Asia Hip Hop Artist: M-Flo
 Mobile Popularity Award: Gummy – "Memory Loss" (기억상실)
 Judges Choice Awards: Kim Yoon-ah – "Nocturne" (야상곡)
 Best Asia Pop Artist: Jerry Yan
 Blue Award: Moon Hee-joon – "Paper Airplane"
 Overseas Viewers' Award: Shinhwa – "Brand New"
 Mnet PD's Choice Award: Deux (posthumous award for Kim Sung Jae)
 Best Asia Pop Artist: Gackt

Multiple awards

Artist(s) with multiple wins
The following artist(s) received two or more wins (excluding the special awards):

Artist(s) with multiple nominations
The following artist(s) received two or more nominations:

Performers and presenters
The following individuals and groups, listed in order of appearance, presented awards or performed musical numbers.

Performers

Presenters

References

External links
 Mnet Asian Music Awards  official website

MAMA Awards ceremonies
Mnet Music Video Festival
Mnet Music Video Festival
Mnet Music Video Festival
Mnet Music Video Festival, 2004